Joseph Delano Shipp (born June 25, 1955) is a former American football tight end who played for the Buffalo Bills of the National Football League (NFL). He played college football at University of Southern California.

References 

1955 births
Living people
American football tight ends
USC Trojans football players
Buffalo Bills players